Wildwood/Loche Mist Farms Aerodrome  is located  south southwest of Wildwood, Alberta, Canada.

References

Registered aerodromes in Alberta